Lance Acord (born September 9, 1964) A.S.C. is an American cinematographer.

Acord was born in Fresno County, California. He attended Sir Francis Drake High School's School Within A School (S.W.A.S.) program and went on to study photography and filmmaking at the San Francisco Art Institute. He began his professional career with photographer/filmmaker Bruce Weber. Together they made documentaries, commercials and music videos.

His breakthrough in the MTV music videos world came when director Stéphane Sednaoui offered him to work on Björk's Big Time Sensuality. Acord continued to work extensively in the commercials and music videos mediums. He earned the MTV Video Music Award for Best Cinematography for his work on Fatboy Slim's "Weapon of Choice", which featured Christopher Walken and was directed by Spike Jonze. He also worked with R.E.M. on a regular basis.

Acord made his first foray into narrative feature filmmaking as the cinematographer on Vincent Gallo's Buffalo '66. Since then, he has been the director of photography on Spike Jonze's features Being John Malkovich, Adaptation (in which he also made a cameo as himself during production of Being John Malkovich) and Where the Wild Things Are, Sofia Coppola's Lost in Translation, Marie Antoinette, and her short film Lick the Star, as well as Peter Care's The Dangerous Lives of Altar Boys.

In the late 1990s Lance began his transition into directing and in 1998, together with his business partner Jackie Kelman Bisbee, founded the production company Park Pictures. Over the years he has received 35 Cannes Lions for his work with clients such as Nike, Apple, HP, Volkswagen, P&G, Subaru and more.  He was nominated Best Commercial Director by the DGA in 2003, 2011, 2012, and 2017. In 2011, Lance's Super Bowl spot for Volkswagen, "The Force", became the undisputed highlight of the year's Super Bowl broadcast.  "The Force" was named the best ad of 2011 by AdWeek, Creativity, and YouTube and consistently ranks on lists of the greatest Super Bowl ads of all time. His Apple film "Misunderstood" won the 2014 Emmy Award for Outstanding Commercial. In 2019 Lance won his second Emmy Award for Nike "Dream Crazy," starring Colin Kaepernick.

His latest work as a director is the short film commercial for Xfinity called A Holiday Reunion, reuniting E.T. and Henry Thomas, who reprises his role as Elliott.

Filmography
 God's Pocket (2014) (cinematographer, producer)
 Where the Wild Things Are (2009)
 Marie Antoinette (2006)
 Lost in Translation (2003)
 Adaptation. (2002)
 The Dangerous Lives of Altar Boys (2002)
 Southlander (2001)
 Chop Suey (2001)
 Eventual Wife (2000) Short
 Being John Malkovich (1999)
 Lick the Star (1998) Short
 Free Tibet (1998) Co-Cinematographer
 Amarillo by Morning (1998)
 Buffalo '66 (1998)
 How They Get There (1997) Short
 Road Movie (1996)
 Gentle Giants (1995) Short
 Billy Nayer (1992) Short

References

External links
Lance Acord's production company ParkPictures
Lance Acord at SFX company Method Studio

Lance Acord at mvdbase
Lance Acord at Cinematographers.nl

1964 births
People from Fresno County, California
American cinematographers
Living people
San Francisco Art Institute alumni